The .376 Steyr cartridge is a rifle cartridge jointly developed by Hornady and Steyr for use in the Steyr Scout rifle.

Introduced in 1999, it is based on the 9.3×64mm Brenneke case, necked up to accept a  diameter bullet. The case is also shortened by about 4 mm to fit a standard length rifle action.

It was developed as an evolution of Jeff Cooper's "Super Scout" medium rifle concept, which was in turn an extension of his original scout rifle concept. Cooper used a version of Steyr's Scout rifle chambered in .350 Remington Magnum to hunt large and dangerous game, originally calling it a "Super Scout". After taking a lion at close range with the weapon, he switched to calling that rifle his "Lion Scout".

An additional motivation for development of the new cartridge was that authorities in certain areas of the world dictate a minimum caliber of round which may be used in hunting dangerous game such as cape buffalo and lion. In general the minimum is either .366 (9.3 mm) or .375 ((9.5 mm) caliber, so to make the cartridge accepted in almost all African countries, the newly designed cartridge uses a .375 caliber bore.

When Steyr initially discussed the new round with Cooper, they intended to call it the .375 Steyr. Cooper said they should instead call it a .376, to avoid confusion with the .375 H&H Magnum.

Cooper subsequently referred to the Scout Rifle in .376 Steyr caliber as the "Dragoon" or "Dragoon Scout," this marking being on the one that Steyr sent him. This designation has been dropped, and is not on production units.

With a higher felt recoil, the .376 Steyr is the largest practical cartridge for use in such a short, lightweight weapon as the Scout. 

Steyr Mannlicher has also produced a conventional-style rifle to use this cartridge, dubbed the "Pro Hunter."

See also
 List of rifle cartridges
 9 mm caliber list of other cartridges in the 9.0 - 9.9 mm range

References 

 C.I.P. TDCC (Tables of Dimensions of Cartridges and Chambers) .376 Steyr
Ching, Eric S. H., Portable Powerhouse: The .376 Steyr Scout The Mannlicher Collector #62, 2000
Cooper, Jeff, Practice Time, Jeff Cooper's Commentaries, Vol. 13, No. 1, January 2005

External links

The Big Bore Steyr Scout and .376 Cartridge from the Steyr Scout Web Site
Website Developer & Designer
Chuck Hawks on .376 Steyr (non-subscription version)

Pistol and rifle cartridges